Kampong Pelambayan (also Kampong Pelambaian) is a village in Brunei-Muara District, Brunei. It is also a neighbourhood in the country's capital Bandar Seri Begawan. The population was 714 in 2016. It is one of the villages within Mukim Kota Batu. The postcode is BD2317.

Facilities 
Pelambayan Religious School is the village's government school for the country's Islamic religious primary education.

The village mosque is Kampong Pelambayan Mosque; it was inaugurated on 20 April 1984 and can accommodate 600 worshippers.

References 

Villages in Brunei-Muara District
Neighbourhoods in Bandar Seri Begawan